The Immortals may refer to:

Literature
The Immortals (poem), by Isaac Rosenburg (1918)
The Immortals (Barjavel novel), a 1973 novel by René Barjavel
The Immortals (Hickman novel), a 1996 novel by Tracy and Laura Hickman
[[The Immortals (series)|The Immortals (series)]], by Tamora Pierce
The Immortals (The Edge Chronicles), the final novel in the Edge Chronicles series
The Immortals (Gunn novel), a novel by James Gunn (author)
 A book series by Alyson Noel beginning with Evermore (novel)

Music
The Immortals (band), a Belgian band
 "The Immortals" (song), a 2011 song by American rock band Kings of Leon

Other uses
"The Immortals" (Cosmos: A Spacetime Odyssey), the eleventh episode of Cosmos: A Spacetime OdysseyThe Immortals (1995 film), 1995 action/crime/drama film
The Immortals (2015 film), 2015 Indian documentary film
The Immortals (neo-nazis), a neo-nazi organization
"The Immortals" (NCIS), an episode of television series NCIS''
The Immortals (rugby league), an accolade bestowed by Rugby League Week magazine
Persian Immortals, an elite military unit of Ancient Persia
Immortals (Byzantine Empire), an elite military unit of the Eastern Roman Empire

See also 
 Immortal (disambiguation)